= Joan R. Rayfield =

Canadian anthropologist and linguist

- Born: 26 February 1919; England
- Died: 8 May 2001 (aged 82); Burlington, Ontario
- Education: University of London; University of Toronto; UCLA

Joan R. Rayfield was an English and Canadian anthropologist and linguist, who was a professor of anthropology at York University. Her publications include The Languages of a Bilingual Community about the uses of Yiddish and English in bilingual Ashkenazic Jewish communities in California in the 1960s, and an English translation of Jacques Maquet's The Black Civilization of Africa and Africanicity. She died at the age of 82 in 2001.

== Selected bibliography ==
J. R. Rayfield, "The Dualism of Lévi-Strauss", International Journal of Comparative Sociology, Vol. 12, (Jan 1, 1971), pp. 267 f.

J. R. Rayfield, “Theories of Urbanization and the Colonial City in West Africa”, Africa 64 (1974), pp. 163–185

J. R. Rayfield, "The Golden Bough Sprouts Again", Philosophy of the Social Sciences Vol. 6 (Sep 1, 1976), pp. 255–272

J. R. Rayfield, "FESPASCO 1987: African Cinema and Cultural Identity", Visual Anthropology 1 (1988), pp. 201–215
